The chief of Navy  is the head of the Republic of Singapore Navy. The incumbent chief is Sean Wat Jianwen, who was appointed on 10 March 2023.

List of chiefs of Navy

References

Republic of Singapore Navy
Singapore